This is a list of the bird species recorded in Mauritania. The avifauna of Mauritania include a total of 577 species, of which one has been introduced by humans. 24 species are globally threatened.

This list's taxonomic treatment (designation and sequence of orders, families and species) and nomenclature (common and scientific names) follow the conventions of The Clements Checklist of Birds of the World, 2022 edition. The family accounts at the beginning of each heading reflect this taxonomy, as do the species counts found in each family account. Introduced and accidental species are included in the total counts for Mauritania.

The following tags have been used to highlight several categories. The commonly occurring native species do not fall into any of these categories.

(A) Accidental - a species that rarely or accidentally occurs in Mauritania
(I) Introduced - a species introduced to Mauritania as a consequence, direct or indirect, of human actions

Ostriches
Order: StruthioniformesFamily: Struthionidae

The ostrich is a flightless bird native to Africa. It is the largest living species of bird. It is distinctive in its appearance, with a long neck and legs and the ability to run at high speeds.

Common ostrich, Struthio camelus

Ducks, geese, and waterfowl
Order: AnseriformesFamily: Anatidae

Anatidae includes the ducks and most duck-like waterfowl, such as geese and swans. These birds are adapted to an aquatic existence with webbed feet, flattened bills, and feathers that are excellent at shedding water due to an oily coating.

White-faced whistling-duck, Dendrocygna viduata
Fulvous whistling-duck, Dendrocygna bicolor
White-backed duck, Thalassornis leuconotus (A)
Greater white-fronted goose, Anser albifrons (A)
Brant, Branta bernicla (A)
Knob-billed duck, Sarkidiornis melanotos
Egyptian goose, Alopochen aegyptiacus
Ruddy shelduck, Tadorna ferruginea (A)
Common shelduck, Tadorna tadorna
Spur-winged goose, Plectropterus gambensis
African pygmy-goose, Nettapus auritus
Garganey, Spatula querquedula
Northern shoveler, Spatula clypeata
Gadwall, Mareca strepera (A)
Eurasian wigeon, Mareca penelope
Mallard, Anas platyrhynchos
Northern pintail, Anas acuta
Green-winged teal, Anas crecca
Marbled teal, Marmaronetta angustirostris (A)
Common pochard, Aythya ferina
Ferruginous duck, Aythya nyroca
Tufted duck, Aythya fuligula
Common scoter, Melanitta nigra (A)

Guineafowl
Order: GalliformesFamily: Numididae

Guineafowl are a group of African, seed-eating, ground-nesting birds that resemble partridges, but with featherless heads and spangled grey plumage. 

Helmeted guineafowl, Numida meleagris

New World quail
Order: GalliformesFamily: Odontophoridae

Despite their family's common name, this species and one other are native to Africa.

 Stone partridge, Ptilopachus petrosus

Pheasants, grouse, and allies
Order: GalliformesFamily: Phasianidae

The Phasianidae are a family of terrestrial birds which consists of quails, snowcocks, francolins, spurfowls, tragopans, monals, pheasants, peafowls and jungle fowls. In general, they are plump (although they vary in size) and have broad, relatively short wings.

Coqui francolin, Campocolinus coqui (A)
Common quail, Coturnix coturnix
Barbary partridge, Alectoris barbara
Double-spurred francolin, Pternistis bicalcaratus

Flamingos
Order: PhoenicopteriformesFamily: Phoenicopteridae

Flamingos filter-feed on shellfish and algae. Their oddly shaped beaks are specially adapted to separate mud and silt from the food they consume and, uniquely, are used upside-down. 

Greater flamingo, Phoenicopterus roseus
Lesser flamingo, Phoenicopterus minor

Grebes
Order: PodicipediformesFamily: Podicipedidae

Grebes are small to medium-large freshwater diving birds. They have lobed toes and are excellent swimmers and divers. However, they have their feet placed far back on the body, making them quite ungainly on land.

Little grebe, Tachybaptus ruficollis
Eared grebe, Podiceps nigricollis (A)

Pigeons and doves
Order: ColumbiformesFamily: Columbidae

Pigeons and doves are stout-bodied birds with short necks and short slender bills with a fleshy cere.

Rock pigeon, Columba livia
Speckled pigeon, Columba guinea
Common wood-pigeon, Columba palumbus (A)
European turtle-dove, Streptopelia turtur
Eurasian collared-dove, Streptopelia decaocto
African collared-dove, Streptopelia roseogrisea
Mourning collared-dove, Streptopelia decipiens
Red-eyed dove, Streptopelia semitorquata
Vinaceous dove, Streptopelia vinacea
Laughing dove, Streptopelia senegalensis
Black-billed wood-dove, Turtur abyssinicus
Namaqua dove, Oena capensis
Bruce's green-pigeon, Treron waalia

Sandgrouse
Order: PterocliformesFamily: Pteroclidae

Sandgrouse have small, pigeon like heads and necks, but sturdy compact bodies. They have long pointed wings and sometimes tails and a fast direct flight. Flocks fly to watering holes at dawn and dusk. Their legs are feathered down to the toes.

Chestnut-bellied sandgrouse, Pterocles exustus
Spotted sandgrouse, Pterocles senegallus
Crowned sandgrouse, Pterocles coronatus
Lichtenstein's sandgrouse, Pterocles lichtensteinii
Four-banded sandgrouse, Pterocles quadricinctus

Bustards
Order: OtidiformesFamily: Otididae

Bustards are large terrestrial birds mainly associated with dry open country and steppes in the Old World. They are omnivorous and nest on the ground. They walk steadily on strong legs and big toes, pecking for food as they go. They have long broad wings with "fingered" wingtips and striking patterns in flight. Many have interesting mating displays.

Arabian bustard, 
Houbara bustard, Chlamydotis undulata
Denham's bustard, Neotis denhami
Nubian bustard, Neotis nuba
White-bellied bustard, Eupodotis senegalensis
Savile's bustard, Eupodotis savilei
Black-bellied bustard, Lissotis melanogaster (A)

Turacos
Order: MusophagiformesFamily: Musophagidae

The turacos, plantain eaters and go-away-birds make up the bird family Musophagidae. They are medium-sized arboreal birds. The turacos and plantain eaters are brightly coloured, usually in blue, green or purple. The go-away birds are mostly grey and white. 

Western plantain-eater, Crinifer piscator

Cuckoos
Order: CuculiformesFamily: Cuculidae

The family Cuculidae includes cuckoos, roadrunners and anis. These birds are of variable size with slender bodies, long tails and strong legs. The Old World cuckoos are brood parasites.

Senegal coucal, Centropus senegalensis
Great spotted cuckoo, Clamator glandarius
Levaillant's cuckoo, Clamator levaillantii
Pied cuckoo, Clamator jacobinus
Dideric cuckoo, Chrysococcyx caprius
Klaas's cuckoo, Chrysococcyx klaas
African cuckoo, Cuculus gularis
Common cuckoo, Cuculus canorus

Nightjars and allies
Order: CaprimulgiformesFamily: Caprimulgidae

Nightjars are medium-sized nocturnal birds that usually nest on the ground. They have long wings, short legs and very short bills. Most have small feet, of little use for walking, and long pointed wings. Their soft plumage is camouflaged to resemble bark or leaves.

Standard-winged nightjar, Caprimulgus longipennis
Red-necked nightjar, Caprimulgus ruficollis
Eurasian nightjar, Caprimulgus europaeus
Egyptian nightjar, Caprimulgus aegyptius
Golden nightjar, Caprimulgus eximius (A)
Plain nightjar, Caprimulgus inornatus
Long-tailed nightjar, Caprimulgus climacurus

Swifts
Order: CaprimulgiformesFamily: Apodidae

Swifts are small birds which spend the majority of their lives flying. These birds have very short legs and never settle voluntarily on the ground, perching instead only on vertical surfaces. Many swifts have long swept-back wings which resemble a crescent or boomerang.

Alpine swift, Apus melba
Common swift, Apus apus
Plain swift, Apus unicolor (A)
Pallid swift, Apus pallidus
Little swift, Apus affinis
White-rumped swift, Apus caffer (A)
African palm-swift, Cypsiurus parvus

Rails, gallinules, and coots
Order: GruiformesFamily: Rallidae

Rallidae is a large family of small to medium-sized birds which includes the rails, crakes, coots and gallinules. Typically they inhabit dense vegetation in damp environments near lakes, swamps or rivers. In general they are shy and secretive birds, making them difficult to observe. Most species have strong legs and long toes which are well adapted to soft uneven surfaces. They tend to have short, rounded wings and to be weak fliers.

Water rail, Rallus aquaticus (A)
Corn crake, Crex crex
African crake, Crex egregia (A)
Spotted crake, Porzana porzana
Eurasian moorhen, Gallinula chloropus
Eurasian coot, Fulica atra
Allen's gallinule, Porphyrio alleni
African swamphen, Porphyrio madagascariensis
Black crake, Zapornia flavirostris
Little crake, Zapornia parva
Baillon's crake, Zapornia pusilla

Cranes
Order: GruiformesFamily: Gruidae

Cranes are large, long-legged and long-necked birds. Unlike the similar-looking but unrelated herons, cranes fly with necks outstretched, not pulled back. Most have elaborate and noisy courting displays or "dances". 

Black crowned-crane, Balearica pavonina
Common crane, Grus grus (A)

Thick-knees
Order: CharadriiformesFamily: Burhinidae

The thick-knees are a group of largely tropical waders in the family Burhinidae. They are found worldwide within the tropical zone, with some species also breeding in temperate Europe and Australia. They are medium to large waders with strong black or yellow-black bills, large yellow eyes and cryptic plumage. Despite being classed as waders, most species have a preference for arid or semi-arid habitats. 

Eurasian thick-knee, Burhinus oedicnemus
Senegal thick-knee, Burhinus senegalensis
Spotted thick-knee, Burhinus capensis

Egyptian plover
Order: CharadriiformesFamily: Pluvianidae

The Egyptian plover is found across equatorial Africa and along the Nile River.

Egyptian plover, Pluvianus aegyptius

Stilts and avocets
Order: CharadriiformesFamily: Recurvirostridae

Recurvirostridae is a family of large wading birds, which includes the avocets and stilts. The avocets have long legs and long up-curved bills. The stilts have extremely long legs and long, thin, straight bills. 

Black-winged stilt, Himantopus himantopus
Pied avocet, Recurvirostra avosetta

Oystercatchers
Order: CharadriiformesFamily: Haematopodidae

The oystercatchers are large and noisy plover-like birds, with strong bills used for smashing or prising open molluscs. 

Eurasian oystercatcher, Haematopus ostralegus

Plovers and lapwings
Order: CharadriiformesFamily: Charadriidae

The family Charadriidae includes the plovers, dotterels and lapwings. They are small to medium-sized birds with compact bodies, short, thick necks and long, usually pointed, wings. They are found in open country worldwide, mostly in habitats near water.

Black-bellied plover, Pluvialis squatarola
European golden-plover, Pluvialis apricaria
American golden-plover, Pluvialis dominica (A)
Northern lapwing, Vanellus vanellus
Spur-winged lapwing, Vanellus spinosus
Black-headed lapwing, Vanellus tectus
White-headed lapwing, Vanellus albiceps
Wattled lapwing, Vanellus senegallus
Brown-chested lapwing, Vanellus superciliosus (A) 
Caspian plover, Charadrius asiaticus (A)
Kittlitz's plover, Charadrius pecuarius
Kentish plover, Charadrius alexandrinus
Common ringed plover, Charadrius hiaticula
Little ringed plover, Charadrius dubius
White-fronted plover, Charadrius marginatus (A)
Eurasian dotterel, Charadrius morinellus (A)

Painted-snipes
Order: CharadriiformesFamily: Rostratulidae

Painted-snipes are short-legged, long-billed birds similar in shape to the true snipes, but more brightly coloured.

Greater painted-snipe, Rostratula benghalensis

Jacanas
Order: CharadriiformesFamily: Jacanidae

The jacanas are a group of tropical waders in the family Jacanidae. They are found throughout the tropics. They are identifiable by their huge feet and claws which enable them to walk on floating vegetation in the shallow lakes that are their preferred habitat.

African jacana, Actophilornis africanus

Sandpipers and allies
Order: CharadriiformesFamily: Scolopacidae

Scolopacidae is a large diverse family of small to medium-sized shorebirds including the sandpipers, curlews, godwits, shanks, tattlers, woodcocks, snipes, dowitchers and phalaropes. The majority of these species eat small invertebrates picked out of the mud or soil. Variation in length of legs and bills enables multiple species to feed in the same habitat, particularly on the coast, without direct competition for food.

Upland sandpiper, Bartramia longicauda (A)
Whimbrel, Numenius phaeopus
Eurasian curlew, Numenius arquata
Bar-tailed godwit, Limosa lapponica
Black-tailed godwit, Limosa limosa
Ruddy turnstone, Arenaria interpres
Red knot, Calidris canutus
Ruff, Calidris pugnax
Broad-billed sandpiper, Calidris falcinellus (A)
Sharp-tailed sandpiper, Calidris acuminata (A)
Curlew sandpiper, Calidris ferruginea
Temminck's stint, Calidris temminckii
Sanderling, Calidris alba
Dunlin, Calidris alpina
Purple sandpiper, Calidris maritima (A)
Baird's sandpiper, Calidris bairdii (A)
Little stint, Calidris minuta
Pectoral sandpiper, Calidris melanotos (A)
Semipalmated sandpiper, Calidris pusilla (A)
Jack snipe, Lymnocryptes minimus
Great snipe, Gallinago media
Common snipe, Gallinago gallinago
Terek sandpiper, Xenus cinereus (A)
Red-necked phalarope, Phalaropus lobatus (A)
Red phalarope, Phalaropus fulicarius
Common sandpiper, Actitis hypoleucos
Green sandpiper, Tringa ochropus
Spotted redshank, Tringa erythropus
Common greenshank, Tringa nebularia
Lesser yellowlegs, Tringa flavipes (A)
Marsh sandpiper, Tringa stagnatilis
Wood sandpiper, Tringa glareola
Common redshank, Tringa totanus

Buttonquail
Order: CharadriiformesFamily: Turnicidae

The buttonquail are small, drab, running birds which resemble the true quails. The female is the brighter of the sexes and initiates courtship. The male incubates the eggs and tends the young.

Small buttonquail, Turnix sylvatica
Quail-plover, Ortyxelos meiffrenii

Pratincoles and coursers
Order: CharadriiformesFamily: Glareolidae

Glareolidae is a family of wading birds comprising the pratincoles, which have short legs, long pointed wings and long forked tails, and the coursers, which have long legs, short wings and long, pointed bills which curve downwards.

Cream-colored courser, Cursorius cursor
Temminck's courser, Cursorius temminckii
Bronze-winged courser, Rhinoptilus chalcopterus
Collared pratincole, Glareola pratincola

Skuas and jaegers
Order: CharadriiformesFamily: Stercorariidae

The family Stercorariidae are, in general, medium to large birds, typically with grey or brown plumage, often with white markings on the wings. They nest on the ground in temperate and arctic regions and are long-distance migrants. 

Great skua, Stercorarius skua
Pomarine jaeger, Stercorarius pomarinus
Parasitic jaeger, Stercorarius parasiticus
Long-tailed jaeger, Stercorarius longicaudus (A)

Auks, murres, and puffins
Order: CharadriiformesFamily: Alcidae

Alcids are superficially similar to penguins due to their black-and-white colours, their upright posture and some of their habits, however they are not related to the penguins and differ in being able to fly. Auks live on the open sea, only deliberately coming ashore to nest.

Common murre, Uria aalge (A)
Razorbill, Alca torda (A)

Gulls, terns, and skimmers
Order: CharadriiformesFamily: Laridae

Laridae is a family of medium to large seabirds, the gulls, terns, and skimmers. Gulls are typically grey or white, often with black markings on the head or wings. They have stout, longish bills and webbed feet. Terns are a group of generally medium to large seabirds typically with grey or white plumage, often with black markings on the head. Most terns hunt fish by diving but some pick insects off the surface of fresh water. Terns are generally long-lived birds, with several species known to live in excess of 30 years. Skimmers are a small family of tropical tern-like birds. They have an elongated lower mandible which they use to feed by flying low over the water surface and skimming the water for small fish.

Black-legged kittiwake, Rissa tridactyla
Sabine's gull, Xema sabini
Slender-billed gull, Chroicocephalus genei
Bonaparte's gull, Chroicocephalus philadelphia (A)
Gray-hooded gull, Chroicocephalus cirrocephalus
Black-headed gull, Chroicocephalus ridibundus
Little gull, Hydrocoloeus minutus
Laughing gull, Leucophaeus atricilla (A)
Franklin's gull, Leucophaeus pipixcan (A)
Mediterranean gull, Ichthyaetus melanocephalus
Audouin's gull, Ichthyaetus audouinii
Common gull, Larus canus
Ring-billed gull, Larus delawarensis (A)
Yellow-legged gull, Larus michahellis
Caspian gull, Larus cachinnans
Lesser black-backed gull, Larus fuscus
Great black-backed gull, Larus marinus (A)
Kelp gull, Larus dominicanus (A)
Sooty tern, Onychoprion fuscatus
Bridled tern, Onychoprion anaethetus
Little tern, Sternula albifrons
Gull-billed tern, Gelochelidon nilotica
Caspian tern, Hydroprogne caspia
Black tern, Chlidonias niger
White-winged tern, Chlidonias leucopterus
Whiskered tern, Chlidonias hybrida
Roseate tern, Sterna dougallii
Common tern, Sterna hirundo
Arctic tern, Sterna paradisaea
Sandwich tern, Thalasseus sandvicensis
Lesser crested tern, Thalasseus bengalensis
West African crested tern, Thalasseus albididorsalis
African skimmer, Rynchops flavirostris

Tropicbirds
Order: PhaethontiformesFamily: Phaethontidae

Tropicbirds are slender white birds of tropical oceans, with exceptionally long central tail feathers. Their heads and long wings have black markings.

Red-billed tropicbird, Phaethon aethereus (A)

Southern storm-petrels
Order: ProcellariiformesFamily: Oceanitidae

The southern storm-petrels are relatives of the petrels and are the smallest seabirds. They feed on planktonic crustaceans and small fish picked from the surface, typically while hovering. The flight is fluttering and sometimes bat-like.

Wilson's storm-petrel, Oceanites oceanicus
White-faced storm-petrel, Pelagodroma marina

Northern storm-petrels
Order: ProcellariiformesFamily: Hydrobatidae

The northern storm-petrels are relatives of the petrels and are the smallest seabirds. They feed on planktonic crustaceans and small fish picked from the surface, typically while hovering. The flight is fluttering and sometimes bat-like.

European storm-petrel, Hydrobates pelagicus
Leach's storm-petrel, Hydrobates leucorhous
Swinhoe's storm-petrel, Hydrobates monorhis (A) 
Band-rumped storm-petrel, Hydrobates castro

Shearwaters and petrels
Order: ProcellariiformesFamily: Procellariidae

The procellariids are the main group of medium-sized "true petrels", characterised by united nostrils with medium septum and a long outer functional primary.

Zino's petrel, Pterodroma madeira
Fea's petrel, Pterodroma feae
Bulwer's petrel, Bulweria bulwerii
Cory's shearwater, Calonectris borealis
Great shearwater, Ardenna gravis
Sooty shearwater, Ardenna griseus (A)
Manx shearwater, Puffinus puffinus (A)
Yelkouan shearwater, Puffinus yelkouan (A)
Balearic shearwater, Puffinus mauretanicus

Storks
Order: CiconiiformesFamily: Ciconiidae

Storks are large, long-legged, long-necked, wading birds with long, stout bills. Storks are mute, but bill-clattering is an important mode of communication at the nest. Their nests can be large and may be reused for many years. Many species are migratory.

African openbill, Anastomus lamelligerus (A)
Black stork, Ciconia nigra
Abdim's stork, Ciconia abdimii
African woolly-necked stork, Ciconia microscelis (A)
White stork, Ciconia ciconia
Saddle-billed stork, Ephippiorhynchus senegalensis (A)
Marabou stork, Leptoptilos crumenifer
Yellow-billed stork, Mycteria ibis

Frigatebirds
Order: SuliformesFamily: Fregatidae

Frigatebirds are large seabirds usually found over tropical oceans. They are large, black-and-white or completely black, with long wings and deeply forked tails. The males have coloured inflatable throat pouches. They do not swim or walk and cannot take off from a flat surface. Having the largest wingspan-to-body-weight ratio of any bird, they are essentially aerial, able to stay aloft for more than a week.

Magnificent frigatebird, Fregata magnificens (A)

Boobies and gannets
Order: SuliformesFamily: Sulidae

The sulids comprise the gannets and boobies. Both groups are medium to large coastal seabirds that plunge-dive for fish.

Brown booby, Sula leucogaster
Northern gannet, Morus bassanus

Anhingas
Order: SuliformesFamily: Anhingidae

Anhingas or darters are often called "snake-birds" because of their long thin neck, which gives a snake-like appearance when they swim with their bodies submerged. The males have black and dark-brown plumage, an erectile crest on the nape and a larger bill than the female. The females have much paler plumage especially on the neck and underparts. The darters have completely webbed feet and their legs are short and set far back on the body. Their plumage is somewhat permeable, like that of cormorants, and they spread their wings to dry after diving.

African darter, Anhinga melanogaster

Cormorants and shags
Order: SuliformesFamily: Phalacrocoracidae

Phalacrocoracidae is a family of medium to large coastal, fish-eating seabirds that includes cormorants and shags. Plumage colouration varies, with the majority having mainly dark plumage, some species being black-and-white and a few being colourful.

Long-tailed cormorant, Microcarbo africanus
Great cormorant, Phalacrocorax carbo

Pelicans
Order: PelecaniformesFamily: Pelecanidae

Pelicans are large water birds with a distinctive pouch under their beak. As with other members of the order Pelecaniformes, they have webbed feet with four toes.

Great white pelican, Pelecanus onocrotalus
Pink-backed pelican, Pelecanus rufescens

Hammerkop
Order: PelecaniformesFamily: Scopidae

The hammerkop is a medium-sized bird with a long shaggy crest. The shape of its head with a curved bill and crest at the back is reminiscent of a hammer, hence its name. Its plumage is drab-brown all over.

Hamerkop, Scopus umbretta

Herons, egrets, and bitterns
Order: PelecaniformesFamily: Ardeidae

The family Ardeidae contains the bitterns, herons and egrets. Herons and egrets are medium to large wading birds with long necks and legs. Bitterns tend to be shorter necked and more wary. Members of Ardeidae fly with their necks retracted, unlike other long-necked birds such as storks, ibises and spoonbills.

Great bittern, Botaurus stellaris (A)
Little bittern, Ixobrychus minutus
Dwarf bittern, Ixobrychus sturmii
White-crested bittern, Tigriornis leucolophus (A) 
Gray heron, Ardea cinerea
Black-headed heron, Ardea melanocephala
Goliath heron, Ardea goliath
Purple heron, Ardea purpurea
Great egret, Ardea alba
Intermediate egret, Ardea intermedia
Little egret, Egretta garzetta
Western reef-heron, Egretta gularis
Black heron, Egretta ardesiaca (A) 
Cattle egret, Bubulcus ibis
Squacco heron, Ardeola ralloides
Striated heron, Butorides striata
Black-crowned night-heron, Nycticorax nycticorax
White-backed night-heron, Gorsachius leuconotus (A)

Ibises and spoonbills
Order: PelecaniformesFamily: Threskiornithidae

Threskiornithidae is a family of large terrestrial and wading birds which includes the ibises and spoonbills. They have long, broad wings with 11 primary and about 20 secondary feathers. They are strong fliers and despite their size and weight, very capable soarers.

Glossy ibis, Plegadis falcinellus
African sacred ibis, Threskiornis aethiopicus
Northern bald ibis, Geronticus eremita
Hadada ibis, Bostrychia hagedash
Eurasian spoonbill, Platalea leucorodia
African spoonbill, Platalea alba

Secretarybird
Order: AccipitriformesFamily: Sagittariidae

The secretarybird is a bird of prey in the order Accipitriformes but is easily distinguished from other raptors by its long crane-like legs.

Secretarybird, Sagittarius serpentarius

Osprey
Order: AccipitriformesFamily: Pandionidae

The family Pandionidae contains only one species, the osprey. The osprey is a medium-large raptor which is a specialist fish-eater with a worldwide distribution.

Osprey, Pandion haliaetus

Hawks, eagles, and kites
Order: AccipitriformesFamily: Accipitridae

Accipitridae is a family of birds of prey, which includes hawks, eagles, kites, harriers and Old World vultures. These birds have powerful hooked beaks for tearing flesh from their prey, strong legs, powerful talons and keen eyesight.

Black-winged kite, Elanus caeruleus
Scissor-tailed kite, Chelictinia riocourii
African harrier-hawk, Polyboroides typus
Bearded vulture, Gypaetus barbatus (A)
Egyptian vulture, Neophron percnopterus
European honey-buzzard, Pernis apivorus
White-headed vulture, Trigonoceps occipitalis
Cinereous vulture, Aegypius monachus (A)
Lappet-faced vulture, Torgos tracheliotos
Hooded vulture, Necrosyrtes monachus
White-backed vulture, Gyps africanus
Rüppell's griffon, Gyps rueppelli
Eurasian griffon, Gyps fulvus
Bateleur, Terathopius ecaudatus
Short-toed snake-eagle, Circaetus gallicus
Beaudouin's snake-eagle, Circaetus beaudouini
Brown snake-eagle, Circaetus cinereus
Martial eagle, Polemaetus bellicosus
Long-crested eagle, Lophaetus occipitalis
Wahlberg's eagle, Hieraaetus wahlbergi
Booted eagle, Hieraaetus pennatus
Tawny eagle, Aquila rapax
Spanish eagle, Aquila adalberti (A)
Golden eagle, Aquila chrysaetos
Verreaux's eagle, Aquila verreauxii
Bonelli's eagle, Aquila fasciata
African hawk-eagle, Aquila spilogaster
Dark chanting-goshawk, Melierax metabates
Gabar goshawk, Micronisus gabar
Grasshopper buzzard, Butastur rufipennis
Eurasian marsh-harrier, Circus aeruginosus
Hen harrier, Circus cyaneus
Pallid harrier, Circus macrourus
Montagu's harrier, Circus pygargus
Shikra, Accipiter badius
Red-thighed sparrowhawk, Accipiter erythropus
Eurasian sparrowhawk, Accipiter nisus
Red kite, Milvus milvus (A)
Black kite, Milvus migrans
African fish-eagle, Haliaeetus vocifer
Common buzzard, Buteo buteo
Long-legged buzzard, Buteo rufinus
Red-necked buzzard, Buteo auguralis

Barn-owls
Order: StrigiformesFamily: Tytonidae

Barn-owls are medium to large owls with large heads and characteristic heart-shaped faces. They have long strong legs with powerful talons. There are 16 species worldwide and 1 species which occurs in Mauritania.

Barn owl, Tyto alba

Owls
Order: StrigiformesFamily: Strigidae

The typical owls are small to large solitary nocturnal birds of prey. They have large forward-facing eyes and ears, a hawk-like beak and a conspicuous circle of feathers around each eye called a facial disk.

Eurasian scops-owl, Otus scops
African scops-owl, Otus senegalensis
Northern white-faced owl, Ptilopsis leucotis
Pharaoh eagle-owl, Bubo ascalaphus
Grayish eagle-owl, Bubo cinerascens
Verreaux's eagle-owl, Bubo lacteus
Pearl-spotted owlet, Glaucidium perlatum
Little owl, Athene noctua
Short-eared owl, Asio flammeus

Mousebirds
Order: ColiiformesFamily: Coliidae

The mousebirds are slender greyish or brown birds with soft, hairlike body feathers and very long thin tails. They are arboreal and scurry through the leaves like rodents in search of berries, fruit and buds. They are acrobatic and can feed upside down. All species have strong claws and reversible outer toes. They also have crests and stubby bills. 

Blue-naped mousebird, Urocolius macrourus

Hoopoes
Order: BucerotiformesFamily: Upupidae

Hoopoes have black, white and orangey-pink colouring with a large erectile crest on their head.

Eurasian hoopoe, Upupa epops

Woodhoopoes and scimitarbills
Order: BucerotiformesFamily: Phoeniculidae

The woodhoopoes are related to the kingfishers, rollers and hoopoes. They most resemble the hoopoes with their long curved bills, used to probe for insects, and short rounded wings. However, they differ in that they have metallic plumage, often blue, green or purple, and lack an erectile crest. 

Green woodhoopoe, Phoeniculus purpureus
Black scimitarbill, Rhinopomastus aterrimus

Ground-hornbills
Order: BucerotiformesFamily: Bucorvidae

The ground-hornbills are terrestrial birds which feed almost entirely on insects, other birds, snakes, and amphibians.

Abyssinian ground-hornbill, Bucorvus abyssinicus

Hornbills
Order: BucerotiformesFamily: Bucerotidae

Hornbills are a group of birds whose bill is shaped like a cow's horn, but without a twist, sometimes with a casque on the upper mandible. Frequently, the bill is brightly coloured.

African gray hornbill, Lophoceros nasutus
Western red-billed hornbill, Tockus kempi

Kingfishers
Order: CoraciiformesFamily: Alcedinidae

Kingfishers are medium-sized birds with large heads, long, pointed bills, short legs and stubby tails.

Common kingfisher, Alcedo atthis
Malachite kingfisher, Corythornis cristatus
African pygmy kingfisher, Ispidina picta
Gray-headed kingfisher, Halcyon leucocephala
Woodland kingfisher, Halcyon senegalensis
Blue-breasted kingfisher, Halcyon malimbica (A)
Striped kingfisher, Halcyon chelicuti
Giant kingfisher, Megaceryle maximus
Pied kingfisher, Ceryle rudis

Bee-eaters
Order: CoraciiformesFamily: Meropidae

The bee-eaters are a group of near passerine birds in the family Meropidae. Most species are found in Africa but others occur in southern Europe, Madagascar, Australia and New Guinea. They are characterised by richly coloured plumage, slender bodies and usually elongated central tail feathers. All are colourful and have long downturned bills and pointed wings, which give them a swallow-like appearance when seen from afar.

Red-throated bee-eater, Merops bulocki
Little bee-eater, Merops pusillus
Swallow-tailed bee-eater, Merops hirundineus (A)
White-throated bee-eater, Merops albicollis
African green bee-eater, Merops viridissimus
Blue-cheeked bee-eater, Merops persicus
European bee-eater, Merops apiaster
Northern carmine bee-eater, Merops nubicus

Rollers
Order: CoraciiformesFamily: Coraciidae

Rollers resemble crows in size and build, but are more closely related to the kingfishers and bee-eaters. They share the colourful appearance of those groups with blues and browns predominating. The two inner front toes are connected, but the outer toe is not. 

European roller, Coracias garrulus
Abyssinian roller, Coracias abyssinica
Rufous-crowned roller, Coracias naevia
Blue-bellied roller, Coracias cyanogaster (A)
Broad-billed roller, Eurystomus glaucurus (A)

African barbets
Order: PiciformesFamily: Lybiidae

The African barbets are plump birds, with short necks and large heads. They get their name from the bristles which fringe their heavy bills. Most species are brightly coloured.

Yellow-breasted barbet, Trachyphonus margaritatus
Yellow-fronted tinkerbird, Pogoniulus chrysoconus
Vieillot's barbet, Lybius vieilloti
Bearded barbet, Lybius dubius

Honeyguides
Order: PiciformesFamily: Indicatoridae

Honeyguides are among the few birds that feed on wax. They are named for the greater honeyguide which leads traditional honey-hunters to bees' nests and, after the hunters have harvested the honey, feeds on the remaining contents of the hive. 

Lesser honeyguide, Indicator minor
Greater honeyguide, Indicator indicator

Woodpeckers
Order: PiciformesFamily: Picidae

Woodpeckers are small to medium-sized birds with chisel-like beaks, short legs, stiff tails and long tongues used for capturing insects. Some species have feet with two toes pointing forward and two backward, while several species have only three toes. Many woodpeckers have the habit of tapping noisily on tree trunks with their beaks.

Eurasian wryneck, Jynx torquilla
Little gray woodpecker, Chloropicus elachus
Cardinal woodpecker, Chloropicus fuscescens
Brown-backed woodpecker, Chloropicus obsoletus
African gray woodpecker, Chloropicus goertae
Fine-spotted woodpecker, Campethera punctuligera
Golden-tailed woodpecker, Campethera abingoni

Falcons and caracaras
Order: FalconiformesFamily: Falconidae

Falconidae is a family of diurnal birds of prey. They differ from hawks, eagles and kites in that they kill with their beaks instead of their talons.

Lesser kestrel, Falco naumanni
Eurasian kestrel, Falco tinnunculus
Fox kestrel, Falco alopex
Gray kestrel, Falco ardosiaceus
Red-necked falcon, Falco chicquera
Red-footed falcon, Falco vespertinus
Eleonora's falcon, Falco eleonorae (A)
Merlin, Falco columbarius (A)
Eurasian hobby, Falco subbuteo
African hobby, Falco cuvierii
Lanner falcon, Falco biarmicus
Saker falcon, Falco cherrug
Peregrine falcon, Falco peregrinus

Old World parrots
Order: PsittaciformesFamily: Psittaculidae

Characteristic features of parrots include a strong curved bill, an upright stance, strong legs, and clawed zygodactyl feet. Many parrots are vividly colored, and some are multi-colored. Old World parrots are found from Africa east across south and southeast Asia and Oceania to Australia and New Zealand.

Rose-ringed parakeet, Psittacula krameri

African and New World parrots
Order: PsittaciformesFamily: Psittacidae

Characteristic features of parrots include a strong curved bill, an upright stance, strong legs, and clawed zygodactyl feet. Many parrots are vividly colored, and some are multi-colored. Most of the more than 150 species in this family are found in the New World.

Senegal parrot, Poicephalus senegalus

Cuckooshrikes
Order: PasseriformesFamily: Campephagidae

The cuckooshrikes are small to medium-sized passerine birds. They are predominantly greyish with white and black, although some species are brightly coloured.

Red-shouldered cuckooshrike, Campephaga phoenicea (A)

Old World orioles
Order: PasseriformesFamily: Oriolidae

The Old World orioles are colourful passerine birds. They are not related to the New World orioles. 

Eurasian golden oriole, Oriolus oriolus
African golden oriole, Oriolus auratus (A)

Wattle-eyes and batises
Order: PasseriformesFamily: Platysteiridae

The wattle-eyes, or puffback flycatchers, are small stout passerine birds of the African tropics. They get their name from the brightly coloured fleshy eye decorations found in most species in this group. 

Senegal batis, Batis senegalensis

Vangas, helmetshrikes, and allies
Order: PasseriformesFamily: Vangidae

The helmetshrikes are similar in build to the shrikes, but tend to be colourful species with distinctive crests or other head ornaments, such as wattles, from which they get their name.

White helmetshrike, Prionops plumatus

Bushshrikes and allies
Order: PasseriformesFamily: Malaconotidae

Bushshrikes are similar in habits to shrikes, hunting insects and other small prey from a perch on a bush. Although similar in build to the shrikes, these tend to be either colourful species or largely black; some species are quite secretive.

Brubru, Nilaus afer
Northern puffback, Dryoscopus gambensis
Black-crowned tchagra, Tchagra senegala
Yellow-crowned gonolek, Laniarius barbarus

Drongos
Order: PasseriformesFamily: Dicruridae

The drongos are mostly black or dark grey in colour, sometimes with metallic tints. They have long forked tails, and some Asian species have elaborate tail decorations. They have short legs and sit very upright when perched, like a shrike. They flycatch or take prey from the ground.

Glossy-backed drongo, Dicrurus divaricatus

Monarch flycatchers
Order: PasseriformesFamily: Monarchidae

The monarch flycatchers are small to medium-sized insectivorous passerines which hunt by flycatching.

African paradise-flycatcher, Terpsiphone viridis

Shrikes
Order: PasseriformesFamily: Laniidae

Shrikes are passerine birds known for their habit of catching other birds and small animals and impaling the uneaten portions of their bodies on thorns. A typical shrike's beak is hooked, like a bird of prey.

Red-backed shrike, Lanius collurio
Red-tailed shrike, Lanius phoenicuroides
Isabelline shrike, Lanius isabellinus (A)
Great gray shrike, Lanius excubitor
Lesser gray shrike, Lanius minor (A)
Gray-backed fiscal, Lanius excubitoroides (A)
Yellow-billed shrike, Lanius corvinus
Northern fiscal, Lanius humeralis
Masked shrike, Lanius nubicus
Woodchat shrike, Lanius senator

Crows, jays, and magpies
Order: PasseriformesFamily: Corvidae

The family Corvidae includes crows, ravens, jays, choughs, magpies, treepies, nutcrackers and ground jays. Corvids are above average in size among the Passeriformes, and some of the larger species show high levels of intelligence.

Maghreb magpie, Pica mauritanica
Piapiac, Ptilostomus afer
Eurasian jackdaw, Corvus monedula (A)
Pied crow, Corvus albus
Brown-necked raven, Corvus ruficollis

Tits, chickadees, and titmice
Order: PasseriformesFamily: Paridae

The Paridae are mainly small stocky woodland species with short stout bills. Some have crests. They are adaptable birds, with a mixed diet including seeds and insects. 

White-shouldered black-tit, Melaniparus guineensis

Penduline-tits
Order: PasseriformesFamily: Remizidae

The penduline-tits are a group of small passerine birds related to the true tits. They are insectivores.

Sennar penduline-tit, Anthoscopus punctifrons
Yellow penduline-tit, Anthoscopus parvulus

Larks
Order: PasseriformesFamily: Alaudidae

Larks are small terrestrial birds with often extravagant songs and display flights. Most larks are fairly dull in appearance. Their food is insects and seeds.

Greater hoopoe-lark, Alaemon alaudipes
Thick-billed lark, Ramphocoris clotbey (A)
Bar-tailed lark, Ammomanes cincturus
Desert lark, Ammomanes deserti
Chestnut-backed sparrow-lark, Eremopterix leucotis
Black-crowned sparrow-lark, Eremopterix nigriceps
Flappet lark, Mirafra rufocinnamomea
Kordofan lark, Mirafra cordofanica
Horsfield’s bushlark, Mirafra javanica
Temminck's lark, Eremophila bilopha
Greater short-toed lark, Calandrella brachydactyla
Dunn's lark, Eremalauda dunni
Mediterranean short-toed lark, Alaudala rufescens
Eurasian skylark, Alauda arvensis (A)
Thekla's lark, Galerida theklae
Crested lark, Galerida cristata

African warblers
Order: PasseriformesFamily: Macrosphenidae

African warblers are small to medium-sized insectivores which are found in a wide variety of habitats south of the Sahara.

Northern crombec, Sylvietta brachyura
Moustached grass-warbler, Melocichla mentalis (A)

Cisticolas and allies
Order: PasseriformesFamily: Cisticolidae

The Cisticolidae are warblers found mainly in warmer southern regions of the Old World. They are generally very small birds of drab brown or grey appearance found in open country such as grassland or scrub.

Yellow-bellied eremomela, Eremomela icteropygialis
Senegal eremomela, Eremomela pusillaGreen-backed camaroptera, Camaroptera brachyura
Cricket longtail, Spiloptila clamans
Tawny-flanked prinia, Prinia subflava
River prinia, Prinia fluviatilis (A)
Rock-loving cisticola, Cisticola aberrans
Winding cisticola, Cisticola marginatus
Croaking cisticola, Cisticola natalensis
Zitting cisticola, Cisticola juncidis
Desert cisticola, Cisticola aridulus

Reed warblers and alliesOrder: PasseriformesFamily: Acrocephalidae

The members of this family are usually rather large for "warblers". Most are rather plain olivaceous brown above with much yellow to beige below. They are usually found in open woodland, reedbeds, or tall grass. The family occurs mostly in southern to western Eurasia and surroundings, but it also ranges far into the Pacific, with some species in Africa.

Eastern olivaceous warbler, Iduna pallida
Western olivaceous warbler, Iduna opaca
Melodious warbler, Hippolais polyglotta
Icterine warbler, Hippolais icterina (A)
Aquatic warbler, Acrocephalus paludicola
Sedge warbler, Acrocephalus schoenobaenus
Marsh warbler, Acrocephalus palustris (A)
Common reed warbler, Acrocephalus scirpaceus
Greater swamp warbler, Acrocephalus rufescens
Great reed warbler, Acrocephalus arundinaceus

Grassbirds and alliesOrder: PasseriformesFamily: Locustellidae

Locustellidae are a family of small insectivorous songbirds found mainly in Eurasia, Africa, and the Australian region. They are smallish birds with tails that are usually long and pointed, and tend to be drab brownish or buffy all over.

Savi's warbler, Locustella luscinioides
Common grasshopper-warbler, Locustella naevia

SwallowsOrder: PasseriformesFamily: Hirundinidae

The family Hirundinidae is adapted to aerial feeding. They have a slender streamlined body, long pointed wings and a short bill with a wide gape. The feet are adapted to perching rather than walking, and the front toes are partially joined at the base.

Plain martin, Riparia paludicola
Bank swallow, Riparia riparia
Eurasian crag-martin, Ptyonoprogne rupestris (A) 
Rock martin, Ptyonoprogne fuligula
Barn swallow, Hirundo rustica
Red-chested swallow, Hirundo lucida
Wire-tailed swallow, Hirundo smithii
Red-rumped swallow, Cecropis daurica
Lesser striped swallow, Cecropis abyssinica (A) 
Mosque swallow, Cecropis senegalensis
Common house-martin, Delichon urbicum

BulbulsOrder: PasseriformesFamily: Pycnonotidae

Bulbuls are medium-sized songbirds. Some are colourful with yellow, red or orange vents, cheeks, throats or supercilia, but most are drab, with uniform olive-brown to black plumage. Some species have distinct crests.

Common bulbul, Pycnonotus barbatus

Leaf warblersOrder: PasseriformesFamily: Phylloscopidae

Leaf warblers are a family of small insectivorous birds found mostly in Eurasia and ranging into Wallacea and Africa. The species are of various sizes, often green-plumaged above and yellow below, or more subdued with greyish-green to greyish-brown colours.

Wood warbler, Phylloscopus sibilatrix
Western Bonelli's warbler, Phylloscopus bonelli
Yellow-browed warbler, Phylloscopus inornatus (A)
Willow warbler, Phylloscopus trochilus
Common chiffchaff, Phylloscopus collybita
Iberian chiffchaff, Phylloscopus ibericus

Bush warblers and alliesOrder: PasseriformesFamily: Scotocercidae

The members of this family are found throughout Africa, Asia, and Polynesia. Their taxonomy is in flux, and some authorities place genus Erythrocerus in another family.

Scrub warbler, Scotocerca inquieta (A)

Sylviid warblers, parrotbills, and alliesOrder: PasseriformesFamily: Sylviidae

The family Sylviidae is a group of small insectivorous passerine birds. They mainly occur as breeding species, as the common name implies, in Europe, Asia and, to a lesser extent, Africa. Most are of generally undistinguished appearance, but many have distinctive songs.

Eurasian blackcap, Sylvia atricapilla
Garden warbler, Sylvia borin
Lesser whitethroat, Curruca curruca
Western Orphean warbler, Curruca hortensis
African desert warbler, Curruca deserti
Sardinian warbler, Curruca melanocephala
Moltoni's warbler, Curruca subalpina (A)
Western subalpine warbler, Curruca iberiae
Eastern subalpine warbler, Curruca cantillans
Greater whitethroat, Curruca communis
Spectacled warbler, Curruca conspicillata (A)

White-eyes, yuhinas, and alliesOrder: PasseriformesFamily: Zosteropidae

The white-eyes are small and mostly undistinguished, their plumage above being generally some dull colour like greenish-olive, but some species have a white or bright yellow throat, breast or lower parts, and several have buff flanks. As their name suggests, many species have a white ring around each eye. 

Northern yellow white-eye, Zosterops senegalensis

Laughingthrushes and alliesOrder: PasseriformesFamily: Leiothrichidae

The members of this family are diverse in size and colouration, though those of genus Turdoides tend to be brown or greyish. The family is found in Africa, India, and southeast Asia.

Fulvous chatterer, Argya fulva
Brown babbler, Turdoides plebejus

OxpeckersOrder: PasseriformesFamily: Buphagidae

As both the English and scientific names of these birds imply, they feed on ectoparasites, primarily ticks, found on large mammals.

Yellow-billed oxpecker, Buphagus africanus

StarlingsOrder: PasseriformesFamily: Sturnidae

Starlings are small to medium-sized passerine birds. Their flight is strong and direct and they are very gregarious. Their preferred habitat is fairly open country. They eat insects and fruit. Plumage is typically dark with a metallic sheen.

European starling, Sturnus vulgaris (A)
Violet-backed starling, Cinnyricinclus leucogaster (A)
Neumann's starling, Onychognathus neumanni
Long-tailed glossy-starling, Lamprotornis caudatus
Chestnut-bellied starling, Lamprotornis pulcher
Lesser blue-eared starling, Lamprotornis chloropterus (A)
Greater blue-eared starling, Lamprotornis chalybaeus
Purple starling, Lamprotornis purpureus (A)

Thrushes and alliesOrder: PasseriformesFamily: Turdidae

The thrushes are a group of passerine birds that occur mainly in the Old World. They are plump, soft plumaged, small to medium-sized insectivores or sometimes omnivores, often feeding on the ground. Many have attractive songs.

Song thrush, Turdus philomelos
Eurasian blackbird, Turdus merula
Ring ouzel, Turdus torquatus (A)

Old World flycatchersOrder: PasseriformesFamily: Muscicapidae

Old World flycatchers are a large group of small passerine birds native to the Old World. They are mainly small arboreal insectivores. The appearance of these birds is highly varied, but they mostly have weak songs and harsh calls.

Spotted flycatcher, Muscicapa striata
Swamp flycatcher, Muscicapa aquatica
Northern black-flycatcher, Melaenornis edolioides
Black scrub-robin, Cercotrichas podobe
Rufous-tailed scrub-robin, Cercotrichas galactotes
Snowy-crowned robin-chat, Cossypha niveicapilla
European robin, Erithacus rubecula
Common nightingale, Luscinia megarhynchos
Bluethroat, Luscinia svecica
European pied flycatcher, Ficedula hypoleuca
Moussier's redstart, Phoenicurus moussieri (A) 
Common redstart, Phoenicurus phoenicurus
Black redstart, Phoenicurus ochruros
Rufous-tailed rock-thrush, Monticola saxatilis
Blue rock-thrush, Monticola solitarius
Whinchat, Saxicola rubetra
European stonechat, Saxicola rubicola
African stonechat, Saxicola torquatus
Mocking cliff-chat, Thamnolaea cinnamomeiventris
Northern anteater-chat, Myrmecocichla aethiops
Northern wheatear, Oenanthe oenanthe
Atlas wheatear, Oenanthe seebohmi
Isabelline wheatear, Oenanthe isabellina
Heuglin's wheatear, Oenanthe heuglini (A) 
Desert wheatear, Oenanthe deserti
Western black-eared wheatear, Oenanthe hispanica (A)
Eastern black-eared wheatear, Oenanthe melanoleuca
White-fronted black-chat, Oenanthe albifrons (A) 
Red-rumped wheatear, Oenanthe moesta
Familiar chat, Oenanthe familiaris
Black wheatear, Oenanthe leucura
White-crowned wheatear, Oenanthe leucopyga
Mourning wheatear, Oenanthe lugens (A) 

Sunbirds and spiderhuntersOrder: PasseriformesFamily: Nectariniidae

The sunbirds and spiderhunters are very small passerine birds which feed largely on nectar, although they will also take insects, especially when feeding young. Flight is fast and direct on their short wings. Most species can take nectar by hovering like a hummingbird, but usually perch to feed. 

Pygmy sunbird, Hedydipna platura
Scarlet-chested sunbird, Chalcomitra senegalensis
Beautiful sunbird, Cinnyris pulchellus
Copper sunbird, Cinnyris cupreus

Weavers and alliesOrder: PasseriformesFamily: Ploceidae

The weavers are small passerine birds related to the finches. They are seed-eating birds with rounded conical bills. The males of many species are brightly coloured, usually in red or yellow and black, some species show variation in colour only in the breeding season.

White-billed buffalo-weaver, Bubalornis albirostris
Speckle-fronted weaver, Sporopipes frontalis
Little weaver, Ploceus luteolus
Southern masked-weaver, Ploceus velatus
Vitelline masked-weaver, Ploceus vitellinus
Heuglin's masked-weaver, Ploceus heuglini
Village weaver, Ploceus cucullatus
Black-headed weaver, Ploceus melanocephalus
Red-billed quelea, Quelea quelea
Northern red bishop, Euplectes franciscanus
Black-winged bishop, Euplectes hordeaceus (A)
Yellow-crowned bishop, Euplectes afer

Waxbills and alliesOrder: PasseriformesFamily: Estrildidae

The estrildid finches are small passerine birds of the Old World tropics and Australasia. They are gregarious and often colonial seed eaters with short thick but pointed bills. They are all similar in structure and habits, but have wide variation in plumage colours and patterns.

African silverbill, Euodice cantans
Orange-cheeked waxbill, Estrilda melpoda
Black-rumped waxbill, Estrilda troglodytes
Quailfinch, Ortygospiza atricollis
Cut-throat, Amadina fasciata
Zebra waxbill, Amandava subflava (A)
Red-cheeked cordonbleu, Uraeginthus bengalus
Green-winged pytilia, Pytilia melba
Red-billed firefinch, Lagonosticta senegala

IndigobirdsOrder: PasseriformesFamily: Viduidae

The indigobirds are finch-like species which usually have black or indigo predominating in their plumage. All are brood parasites, which lay their eggs in the nests of estrildid finches. 

Pin-tailed whydah, Vidua macroura
Sahel paradise-whydah, Vidua orientalis
Village indigobird, Vidua chalybeata

Old World sparrowsOrder: PasseriformesFamily: Passeridae

Old World sparrows are small passerine birds. In general, sparrows tend to be small, plump, brown or grey birds with short tails and short powerful beaks. Sparrows are seed eaters, but they also consume small insects.

House sparrow, Passer domesticus (I)
Northern gray-headed sparrow, Passer griseus
Desert sparrow, Passer simplex
Sudan golden sparrow, Passer luteus
Yellow-spotted bush sparrow, Gymnoris pyrgita
Sahel bush sparrow, Gymnoris dentata

Wagtails and pipitsOrder: PasseriformesFamily: Motacillidae

Motacillidae is a family of small passerine birds with medium to long tails. They include the wagtails, longclaws and pipits. They are slender, ground feeding insectivores of open country.

Mountain wagtail, Motacilla clara (A)
Gray wagtail, Motacilla cinerea
Western yellow wagtail, Motacilla flava
White wagtail, Motacilla alba
Richard's pipit, Anthus richardi (A)
Long-billed pipit, Anthus similis (A)
Tawny pipit, Anthus campestris
Plain-backed pipit, Anthus leucophrys
Meadow pipit, Anthus pratensis
Tree pipit, Anthus trivialis
Olive-backed pipit, Anthus hodgsoni (A)
Red-throated pipit, Anthus cervinus

Finches, euphonias, and alliesOrder: PasseriformesFamily: Fringillidae

Finches are seed-eating passerine birds, that are small to moderately large and have a strong beak, usually conical and in some species very large. All have twelve tail feathers and nine primaries. These birds have a bouncing flight with alternating bouts of flapping and gliding on closed wings, and most sing well.

Common chaffinch, Fringilla coelebs (A)
Brambling, Fringilla montifringilla (A)
Trumpeter finch, Bucanetes githagineus
European greenfinch, Chloris chloris (A)
White-rumped seedeater, Crithagra leucopygia
Yellow-fronted canary, Crithagra mozambica
Eurasian linnet, Linaria cannabina
Eurasian siskin, Spinus spinus (A)

Old World buntingsOrder: PasseriformesFamily''': Emberizidae

The emberizids are a large family of passerine birds. They are seed-eating birds with distinctively shaped bills. Many emberizid species have distinctive head patterns.

Brown-rumped bunting, Emberiza affinisCorn bunting, Emberiza calandra (A)
Ortolan bunting, Emberiza hortulanaGolden-breasted bunting, Emberiza flaviventrisGosling's bunting, Emberiza goslingiHouse bunting, Emberiza sahariStriolated bunting, Emberiza striolataLittle bunting, Emberiza pusilla'' (A)

See also
List of birds
Lists of birds by region

References

External links
Birds of Mauritania - World Institute for Conservation and Environment

Mauritania
Mauritania
Birds
Mauritania